Tressler William Way (born April 18, 1990) is an American football punter for the Washington Commanders of the National Football League (NFL). He played college football at Oklahoma and was signed by the Chicago Bears as an undrafted free agent in 2013.

Early life
Born Tresslar William Way in Tulsa, Oklahoma, Way attended Union High School in Tulsa and graduated in 2008. While at Union High School, he played high school football for Union.

College career
Way attended the University of Oklahoma and redshirted his freshman season with the Oklahoma Sooners football team. He then played in 53 games from the 2009 to 2012 seasons. Way averaged 44.0 yards per punt with a career long of 85. Way switched to punter after an unsuccessful stint at kicker. Of Way's 250 punts, 91 went inside the 20, 71 were for 50 or more yards, and 36 were touchbacks. Way completed his bachelor's degree at Oklahoma in interdisciplinary studies in December 2012.

College statistics

Professional career

Chicago Bears
The Chicago Bears signed Way as an undrafted free agent on April 28, 2013. He was brought in to challenge veteran Adam Podlesh. The Bears waived him on August 25, 2013.

He re-signed with the Bears for the 2014 offseason, but he was waived again after losing out to rookie Pat O'Donnell on August 18, 2014.

Washington Redskins / Football Team / Commanders

The Washington Redskins claimed Way off waivers on August 20, 2014. In his first preseason game with the team, he recorded an average of 45.3 yards off of four punts. He became their starting punter for the 2014 season following the release of Robert Malone. For the 2014 season, Way led the NFL in gross punting average with 47.5 yards. He finished his rookie season with 77 punts for 3,659 net yards.

At the start of the 2015 season, Way was voted as the team's special teams captain. Overall, he finished the 2015 season with 70 punts for 3,224 net yards for a 46.6 average.

On March 4, 2016, the Redskins extended a tender to Way. The Redskins later signed him to a five-year contract extension on March 12. He finished the 2016 season with 49 punts for 2,209 net yards for a 45.08 average.

In the 2017 season, Way finished with 83 punts for 3,794 net yards for a 45.7 average.

In Week 10 of the 2018 season, Way punted five times for a net average of 47.8, downing four punts inside the 20-yard line, in a 16–3 win over the Tampa Bay Buccaneers, earning him NFC Special Teams Player of the Week. Overall, Way finished the 2018 season with 79 punts for 3,581 net yards for a 45.33 average.

In Week 13 of the 2019 season, Way hit two of his five punts inside the 20 with an average of 58 yards per punt and a long of 79 yards in a 29–21 win over the Carolina Panthers, earning NFC Special Teams Player of the Week. For his performance in 2019, Way was voted to the 2020 Pro Bowl, as well as being named second-team All-Pro. On December 27, 2019, Way signed a four-year, $15 million contract extension. He finished the 2019 season with 79 punts for 3,919 net yards for a 49.61 average.

In Week 11 of the 2020 season against the Cincinnati Bengals, Way punted five times with a gross average of 50.4 yards while landing three of them inside the 20 during the 20–9 win, later earning the NFC Special Teams Player of the Week award.
In Week 14 against the San Francisco 49ers, Way averaged 49.8 yards on 8 punts during the 23–15 win.
Way was named the NFC Special Teams Player of the Week for his performance in Week 14.

In December 2022, Way was voted into the 2023 Pro Bowl.

Personal life 
In 2013, Way married Brianna Turang, a softball and soccer player at the University of Oklahoma and daughter of former Major League Baseball outfielder Brian Turang. Way is a Christian.

References

External links

Washington Commanders bio
Oklahoma Sooners bio

1990 births
Living people
American football punters
Chicago Bears players
National Conference Pro Bowl players
Oklahoma Sooners football players
Players of American football from Oklahoma
Sportspeople from Tulsa, Oklahoma
Washington Commanders players
Washington Football Team players
Washington Redskins players